Humberto Mauro da Silva Teixeira or simply Humberto (born 10 December 1966) is a former Brazilian football striker.

Career
Born in Volta Redonda, Humberto began playing football in the youth sides of Fluminense Football Club. He turned professional with his home town's Volta Redonda Futebol Clube, where he would become the club's all-time leading scorer with 61 goals.

In 1994, Humberto returned to Fluminense to play in the Campeonato Brasileiro Série A. He was red-carded on his debut, a 1–1 draw against Palmeiras. The following year, Humberto competed for Grêmio Foot-Ball Porto Alegrense in the Brasileiro.

At the end of his playing career, Humberto returned to Volta Redonda and won the 2005 Taça Guanabara. The club made a special tribute to their former player Humberto in 2013.

References

External links
Humberto at playmakerstats.com (English version of ogol.com.br)

1966 births
Living people
Brazilian footballers
Fluminense FC players
Volta Redonda FC players
Grêmio Foot-Ball Porto Alegrense players
Esporte Clube Vitória players
Avaí FC players
Associação Desportiva Cabofriense players
Association football forwards
Sportspeople from Rio de Janeiro (state)